Kewin Orellana (born January 8, 1992) is a Swiss professional ice hockey defenceman. He is currently playing for the SC Bern of Switzerland's National League A.

References

External links

1992 births
Living people
SC Bern players
Swiss ice hockey defencemen